Pablo Torres (born March 10, 1984) is an Argentine former professional footballer who last played for Dorados de Sinaloa of the Ascenso MX.

References

Living people
1984 births
Argentine footballers
Association football forwards
Club Atlético Independiente footballers
Racing Club de Montevideo players
C.F. Mérida footballers
C.D. Veracruz footballers
Cruz Azul footballers
Dorados de Sinaloa footballers
Liga MX players
Expatriate footballers in Uruguay
Expatriate footballers in Mexico
Argentine expatriate footballers